Juan Alfaro may refer to:

Juan Ignacio Alfaro (born 2000), Costa Rican footballer
Juan Pablo Alfaro (born 1979), Mexican footballer